Gabby May (born 29 December 1993) is a Canadian artistic gymnast.

May attended high school at Collège Jeanne-Sauvé and studied English at the University of Illinois at Chicago.

She competed at the 2010 Commonwealth Games where she won bronze medals in the vault and team all-around events.

References

1993 births
Living people
University of Illinois Chicago alumni
Sportspeople from Winnipeg
Canadian female artistic gymnasts
Commonwealth Games medallists in gymnastics
Commonwealth Games bronze medallists for Canada
Gymnasts at the 2010 Commonwealth Games
Medallists at the 2010 Commonwealth Games